Haja Coração (English title: Burning Hearts) is a Brazilian telenovela produced and broadcast by TV Globo. It is based on the 1987 classic Sassaricando created by Silvio de Abreu. It premiered on 31 May 2016, replacing Totalmente Demais at the 7 p.m. timeslot. Written by Daniel Ortiz in collaboration with; Patrícia Moretzsohn, Flávia Bessone, Isabel Muniz and Nilton Braga.

Features performances by Mariana Ximenes, Malvino Salvador, Alexandre Borges, Tatá Werneck, Jayme Matarazzo, Fernanda Vasconcellos, Cléo Pires, Marisa Orth, João Baldasserini, Agatha Moreira, José Loreto, Chandelly Braz and Gabriel Godoy.

Production 
Despite having several characters and themes from Sassaricando, the author Daniel Ortiz, considers Haja Coração not a remake, having only inspired by Silvio de Abreu's telenovela, he maintained some cores and situations and while eliminating others. Basically, it is a reboot. The author also maintained the city of São Paulo as a backdrop to the telenovela, but prefers to show as a more solar and cheerful version, without violence.  Scenes were recorded at Vale do Anhangabaú, Vila Madalena, Avenida Paulista and in Bom Retiro. In a unique action, the last episode of Totalmente Demais had "crossover" with Haja Coração: the character Fedora, portrayed by Tatá Werneck, featured in the publishing of the magazine Totalmente Demais on the cover of the publication.

The production also has a spin-off: the animated series, Tito Cachorrinho e sua Turma, inspired by the puppy Tito. The puppy of Jack Russell Terrier will be a character of the telenovela. The series will be launched in a partnership between Gshow and Som Livre. Clips with music and choreography, in addition to a line of products licensed and the launch is planned after the launch of the novella, on the YouTube channel of Som Livre, in Gshow and Globoplay.

Casting and character development 
The choices of an actress to portray Tancinha were rather a challenge. Monica Iozzi was the first to be invited to the character but she declined the invitation. Leandra Leal and Paolla Oliveira were also options for the character due to their experiences. Oliveira was later announced as interpreter of character, but due to her portrayal at  Além do Tempo, in which she was one of the protagonists, the network decided to live her out, for her to take a break from the small screen. A third option, Isis Valverde, was then considered but she had commitments. Thus, Mariana Ximenes was offered the role. Dani Calabresa auditioned to portray Fedora, but the direction of Zorra Total vetoed the participation of same. Tatá Werneck was announced as interpreter of the role. Regina Casé was announced to play Theodore same as Maria Clara Gueiros, both could not participate for being involved with other projects. Grace Gianoukas got the role instead. Christiane Torloni was originally cast as Francesca but chose to join the cast of Velho Chico, Marisa Orth later replaced her. Unlike other characters, the one played by Fernanda Vasconcellos, the writers changed the name of the character Brigite to Bruna. Chay Suede was to interpret Giovanni but preferred to dedicate himself to the feature film, Minha Fama de Mau, leaving Jayme Matarazzo for the character. Initially, Mauricio Destri also auditioned for the character Beto but João Baldasserini was preferred over him.

Plot 
Set in Mooca, a  simple neighborhood of São Paulo, the plot follows the life of Tancinha (Mariana Ximenes), a simple and clumsy girl who, having been raised in the traditional Italian family, holds a strong accent. For fifteen years she has lived a romance spiced up with the mechanic Apolo (Malvino Salvador), full of  fights and reconciliations since both have strong personalities. Their love is shaken when she meets Beto (João Baldasserini), an advertiser willing to win her over with his charm and he shows a world of options outside her routine life. Tancinha is the eldest daughter of Francesca Di Marino (Marisa Orth), a marketer who alone, raised her four children: the gentle Giovanni (Jayme Matarazzo), the envious Carmela (Chandelly Braz) and the long-suffering Shirlei (Sabrina Petraglia), as well as Tancinha. Francesca never accepted the mysterious disappearance of her husband, Guido (Werner Schünemann), and suspected that the businessman Aparício (Alexandre Borges) was linked to the event after finding some clues, with the help of Tancinha.

When younger, Aparício was poor who left his true love, Rebeca (Malu Mader), and opted to be a gold digger and marrying a millionaire Teodora Abdala (Grace Gianoukas), a bossy Harridan who inherited a conglomeration of companies. He assumed the Presidency of the company next to her wife woman, although it is she who give the orders, and both gave had a daughter Fedora (Tatá Werneck), an it girl, extravagant, spoiled girl who became the image of the mother. She marries the mysterious Leonardo (Gabriel Godoy), who initially was planning a coup to keep all the money, but ends up falling for her. However, while attempting to abort the plan to kill Fedora in a helicopter explosion, he ends up accidentally killing Teodora and now has to cover up the lies to keep his wife.

Rebecca, on the other hand, lived in Europe for a long time and became a brilliant architect, but returned to Brazil without any money after discovering that her late husband spent all they had before he died. She joins the two friends who are also bankrupt – Penelope (Carolina Ferraz), a former housewife who got divorced without taking anything, and Leonora (Ellen Rocche), a former member of Big Brother Brazil – for hunting a millionaire husband and save the three.  She finds a job in the company of Abdalas and rejoins with Aparício, pretending to be a simple janitor. Already Camila (Agatha Moreira), the arrogant niece Teodora, was responsible for the wrongful arrest of Giovanni, who after being released and vows to take revenge on her. However, when she loses her memory, she falls in love with Giovanni who reciprocates despite the bitterness. Moreover, Bruna (Fernanda Vasconcellos), Giovanni's girlfriend, is a thorn on his side as she intends to do everything to separate them.

Cast

Soundtrack

Volume 1 
 Cover Mariana Ximenes and Malvino Salvador

The first volume of Haja Coração'''s soundtracks was released on 27 May 2016 by Som Livre label. It comprised mainly songs from different artists with different genres.

 Volume 2 

 Reception 

 Ratings 

On its premiere, Haja Coração registered a viewership rating of 27 points in Greater São Paulo, thus, being the most watched show at its timeslot, taking into account, the parallel premiere of Escrava Mãe on Rede Record. Hence better audience  compared to its predecessor, Totalmente Demais''. The second episode registered 26.4 points according to the consolidated data by IBOPE.

The show recorded significantly higher ratings, for instance, on 11 August, it recorded a viewership ratings of 31.6 points in São Paulo and 33 points in Rio de Janeiro (with 47% audience share).

Its final episode registered 31.1 points.

References

External links 
  
 

2016 telenovelas
Brazilian telenovelas
2016 Brazilian television series debuts
2016 Brazilian television series endings
TV Globo telenovelas
Television series reboots
Portuguese-language telenovelas